How the Steel Was Tempered or The Making of a Hero, is a socialist realist novel written by Nikolai Ostrovsky (1904–1936). With 36.4 million copies sold, it is one of the best-selling books of all time and the best-selling book in the Russian language.

Summary 
The story follows the life of Pavel Korchagin, including his fighting in and aftermath of the Russian Civil War. Korchagin fought for the Bolsheviks during the war and was injured. The novel examines how Korchagin heals from his wounds and thus becomes as strong as steel.

The novel begins when Korchagin is 12, living in the town of Shepetovka in Ukraine. He gets kicked out of school for putting tobacco in some bread dough and must go to work as a dishwasher. As a dishwasher he is beaten by a coworker, but his brother Artyom defends him. The novel jumps forward to age 16 when he is working in a power plant. He meets a Bolshevik named Zhukhrai after a run-in with the Tsarist secret police. Zhukrai tells him about the Bolsheviks and Lenin. He also meets Tonia Toumanova, his love interest. Again the novel jumps, to 1917 as the German army invades Shepetovka. Korchagin fights the Germans, and eventually joins the Bolsheviks in the Civil War. He is seriously injured and partially loses his sight. After the war he worked as a laborer, including building railways. He eventually is injured further, and loses his legs and a hand. He goes to Crimea to live out his days. The book closes with Korchagin sitting down to write an autobiography: "How the Steel Was Tempered", thus establishing the book as a self-fulfilling framing device.

Analysis

The story is a fictionalized autobiography of its author, Nikolai Ostrovsky. In real life, Ostrovsky's father died, and his mother worked as a cook. As he joined the war with the Red Army, he lost his right eye from artillery fire during the war.

In 2016, Russia's newspaper Russia Beyond The Headlines analyzed the story as part of the Soviet narrative of Communism forging uncivilized men into ideal men, like iron into steel. The protagonist fits the mold of pre-Khrushchev literature: an immaculate, ideally communistic individual.

Characters

 Pavel Korchagin – The novel's protagonist. He is fighting on the Bolsheviks' side in the Civil War (1918–1921). He is a quintessential positive hero of socialist realism.
 Tonia Toumanova – Pavel's teenage love. Tonia and Pavel became good friends after their first encounter, which later develops into an intimate relationship. Though born of a wealthy and influential family, Tonia treated everyone equally unlike her friends, who only interact with other children of well-reputed families. However, this changed as she grew up, as she became more aware of her appearance and social status of others.

Publication history
The first part of How the Steel was Tempered was published serially in 1932 in the magazine Young Guard. The second part of the novel appeared in the same magazine from January to May, 1934. The novel was published in 1936 in book form in a heavily edited version that conformed to the rules of socialist realism. In the serial version Ostrovsky had described the tense atmosphere of Pavel's home, his suffering when he became an invalid, the deterioration of his relationship with his wife, and their separation. All of this disappeared in the 1936 publication and in later editions of the novel.

Adaptations
In the Soviet Union, three films were produced based on this novel:
How the Steel Was Tempered (1942)
Pavel Korchagin (1956, Korchagin was played by Vasily Lanovoy)
 How the Steel Was Tempered, 1973 (TV series of 6 episodes; Korchagin was played by Vladimir Konkin)
 In China, the novel was adapted into a television series of the same title in 2000; all the members of the cast were from Ukraine.

In other media
 The third studio album of Russian experimental group Shortparis is titled Tak zakalyalas stal (Russian: Так закалялась сталь, lit. 'Thus the Steel Was Tempered') (2019).

References

External links

 
 How the Steel Was Tempered, English translation: Part 1, Part 2 
 Елена Толстая-Сегал, К литературному фону книги : 'Как закалялась сталь', Cahiers du Monde Russe  Année 1981  22-4  pp. 375-399
 Лев Аннинский, Обрученные с идеей (О повести 'Как закалялась сталь' Николая Островского),
 Раиса Островская, Николай Островский, серия ЖЗЛ, Молодая гвардия, 1984
 Евгений Бузни, Литературное досье Николая Островского
 Тамара Андронова, Слишком мало осталось жить... Николай Островский. Биография. – М.: Государственный музей – Гуманитарный центр «Преодоление» имени Н.А. Островского, 2014.

1936 Russian novels
Socrealist novels
Nikolai Ostrovsky
Novels about revolutionaries
Novels set in Russia
Novels set in Ukraine
Russian novels adapted into films